Drywood Creek is a stream in Alberta, Canada.

Drywood Creek's name comes from the Indians of the area.

See also
List of rivers of Alberta

References

Rivers of Alberta